Luigi Pastore (Aversa, Province of Caserta, May 24, 1834 - January 19, 1913) was an Italian painter.

Born to working-class parents, he studied at the Academy of Fine Arts of Naples, and painted mainly landscapes, historic and sacred subjects, or Neo-Pompeian themes. In 1885 at the Mostra Borbonica of Naples, he displayed The daughter of Titian and in 1859, he sent St. Anthony Abbot mourning on the remains of St Paul, the first hermit. In 1874, he sent to the Promotrice partenopea, the canvas Il cadavere di Coligny, and in 1879, La piccola operaia. In later years, he returned to his native town of Aversa where he became an educator and sponsor of the arts.

Among his historic canvases are Il pentimento di Fanfulla di Lodi, La congiura di Marin Faliero He also painted (now restored) lateral walls of the church of Santi Filippo e Giacomo in Aversa, and frescoes in the Palazzo municipale of Frattamaggiore, including Il cardinale Fabrizio Ruffo libera Aversa dai francesi. He also painted medallions with illustrious men of the town for the ceiling of the Council hall of the Palazzo municipale of Aversa.

Among his pupils were his grandson Girolamo Pastore, Giovanni Conti, and Vincenzo Cecere.

References

1834 births
1913 deaths
19th-century Italian painters
Italian male painters
20th-century Italian painters
Painters from Naples
Neo-Pompeian painters
Fresco painters
19th-century Italian male artists
20th-century Italian male artists